Islamic Foundation is a mosque located in Villa Park, Illinois. It was built in 1974 and was one of the largest mosques in the United States upon its completion. The mosque is connected to Islamic Foundation School, with which it is affiliated.

History
The organization that runs the mosque was founded in 1974, when it was registered with the State of Illinois as a non-profit organization. Through the organization, Islamic Foundation School would be established in 1988. By 1995, the local community had raised enough money to begin the construction of a new full mosque as part of the school. The mosque was completed in 1998 at a cost of $3.6 million.

See also
List of Mosques in Illinois
Islam in the United States
Islamic Architecture
 List of mosques in the Americas
 Lists of mosques
 List of mosques in the United States

References

External links
 

Mosques completed in 1998
Mosques in Illinois
1998 establishments in Illinois